Major-General Sir Gerald Farrell Boyd  (19 November 1877 – 12 April 1930) was a senior British Army officer who went on to be Military Secretary.

Military career
Educated at St Paul's School, Boyd enlisted into the Devonshire Regiment in 1895. He fought in the Second Boer War 1899-1901, and took part in the Relief of Ladysmith, including the actions at Colenso; and in the operations in Orange River Colony, including the action at Wittebergen. During the war, he was commissioned into the 2nd battalion East Yorkshire Regiment in May 1900, and promoted to lieutenant in that regiment on 26 April 1902. He was mentioned in despatches three times (including 25 April 1902), received the Queen's South Africa Medal, and was appointed a Companion of the Distinguished Service Order (DSO) for his war service. The battalion stayed in South Africa throughout the war, and he returned home on the SS Orotava in December 1902, when they were stationed at Aldershot. He went on to be Brigade Major for 11th Infantry Brigade in 1912.

He served in World War I with 11th Infantry Brigade as part of the British Expeditionary Force. He became a General Staff Officer with 1st Division and with 6th Division before becoming a Brigadier-General on the General Staff of 5th Army Corps in France in 1916. He was made Commander 170th Infantry Brigade in France in July 1918 and General Officer Commanding 46th (North Midland) Division in September 1918. He led the 46th Division when it successfully stormed the Hindenburg Line at Bellenglise during the Battle of St Quentin Canal.

After the War he was made a Brigadier General on the General Staff at General Headquarters of British Army on the Rhine and then General Officer Commanding Dublin District in Ireland in 1920. He was appointed Commandant of the Staff College, Quetta, in 1923 and Military Secretary in 1927. He died of cerebral spinal fever in 1930.

Family
In 1913 he married Grace Sophia Burdett and they went on to have two sons.

References

Further reading

|-

|-

|-

 

1877 births
1930 deaths
People educated at St Paul's School, London
British Army major generals
Devonshire Regiment soldiers
East Yorkshire Regiment officers
Knights Commander of the Order of the Bath
Companions of the Order of St Michael and St George
Companions of the Distinguished Service Order
Recipients of the Distinguished Conduct Medal
Commandants of the Staff College, Quetta
Military personnel from London
British Army generals of World War I